"Ben Bolt" is a poem by Thomas Dunn English.

Ben Bolt may also refer to:
 Ben Bolt, Texas
 Big Ben Bolt, comic strip
 Ben Bolt (director), director of The Big Town (1987)
 Ben Bolt, pen name of Ottwell Binns (1872 - 1935), British novelist and Unitarian minister